The Tape of Only Linda is the second full-length album by The Loud Family, released in 1994. The title of the album is a reference to the notorious tape recording of a live performance of "Hey Jude," by Paul McCartney, in which an engineer had isolated Linda McCartney's vocals.

Critical reception
Trouser Press wrote that "the sound is sharp, and the quintet rocks out with an epic mélange of amped-up guitars, odd rhythms and insinuating keyboard riffs, but the disappointing end result is neither particularly inventive nor especially tuneful."

Track listing
"Soul Drain" (Miller, Smith, Wieneke)– 4:12
"My Superior" (Smith, Miller)– 4:49
"Marcia and Etrusca" (Miller, Becker, Smith, Wieneke, Poor)– 7:14
"Hyde Street Virgins" (Miller)– 4:02
"Baby Hard-To-Be-Around" (Miller, Becker, Smith, Wieneke, Poor)– 3:32
"It Just Wouldn't Be Christmas" (Miller, Smith, Wieneke, Poor, Becker)– 4:38
"Better Nature" (Wieneke)– 3:25
"Still Its Own Reward" (Miller)– 4:12
"For Beginners Only" (Smith)– 2:41
"Ballet Hetero" (Miller, Poor, Smith)– 7:27

Personnel
Jozef Becker - drums, percussion, drum programming
Scott Miller - lead vocal, guitar, classical guitar
R. Dunbar Poor - bass guitar and backing vocals
Zachary Smith - lead guitar, electromagnetic 12-string guitar, pedal effect guitar
Paul Wieneke - keyboards, backing vocals, lead vocal on "Better Nature" and "For Beginners Only"

with:
"Waxy" Bill Dupp - harmonica
Mitch Easter - producer
Kid Shaline - backing vocals
Ken Stringfellow - guitar, duet vocal on "Still Its Own Reward"

References

1994 albums
The Loud Family albums
Albums produced by Mitch Easter